The 1935–36 Football League season was Birmingham Football Club's 40th in the Football League and their 23rd in the First Division. They finished in 12th position in the 22-team division. They entered the 1935–36 FA Cup at the third round proper and lost to Barnsley in that round after a replay.

Twenty-seven players made at least one appearance in nationally organised competition, and there were fourteen different goalscorers. Forward Fred Harris was ever-present for the 44-match season, and Charlie Wilson Jones was leading scorer with 20 goals, of which 19 came in the league.

Football League First Division

League table (part)

FA Cup

Appearances and goals

Players with name struck through and marked  left the club during the playing season.

See also
Birmingham City F.C. seasons

References
General
 
 
 Source for match dates and results: 
 Source for lineups, appearances, goalscorers and attendances: Matthews (2010), Complete Record, pp. 312–13.
 Source for kit: "Birmingham City". Historical Football Kits. Retrieved 22 May 2018.

Specific

Birmingham City F.C. seasons
Birmingham